The 2008 gubernatorial election in Washington was held on November 4, 2008. Republican Dino Rossi and incumbent Democratic Governor Christine Gregoire emerged from the August 19 primary. This made the 2008 election a rematch between the candidates from the 2004 election, the closest gubernatorial election in the state's history. In contrast to the recounts and months of legal challenges in their previous contest, Gregoire was the clear winner on November 5, earning 53 percent of the vote. With a margin of 6.45%, this election was the second-closest race of the 2008 gubernatorial election cycle, behind only the election in North Carolina.

Timeline

Candidates

|-
!style="background-color:#E9E9E9" valign=top|Candidate
!style="background-color:#E9E9E9"|Stated party preference
!style="background-color:#E9E9E9"|Website
!style="background-color:#E9E9E9"|Notes
|-
|Christine Gregoire || Prefers Democratic Party || cw || Incumbent governor
|-
|Dino Rossi || Prefers G.O.P. Party || cw || Ex-state senator, 2004 gubernatorial nominee
|-
|Will Baker || Prefers Reform Party || cw || Out; lost primary
|-
|Duff Badgley || Prefers Green Party || cw || Out; lost primary
|-
|John W. Aiken Jr. || Prefers Republican Party || cw || Out; lost primary
|-
|Christian Pierre Joubert || Prefers Democratic Party || cw || Out; lost primary
|-
|Chris Tudor || States No Party Preference || cw || Out; lost primary
|-
|Javier O. Lopez || Prefers Republican Party || cw || Out; lost primary
|-
|Mohammad Hasan Said || States No Party Preference || cw || Out; lost primary
|-
|James White || Prefers Independent Party || cw || Out; lost primary
|-
|colspan=4 align=left|Source: Secretary of State
|}

Primary election
The Washington primary election was held August 19, 2008. For the first time, Washington ran a top-two primary, eliminating the "pick a party" primary used since 2004. Unlike traditional primaries, wherein each party with more than one candidate is reduced to a single person to appear on the general election ballot, the system simply reduces the entire crop of candidates from all parties down to the top two candidates, resulting in no more than two candidates appearing on the general election ballot for a given position. As a result, candidates from all parties were essentially running against each other. To allow for ideological identification, each candidate in a partisan race was allowed to indicate an arbitrary party preference.

Controversy over Rossi's party preference
Under the changes to election law made by the passage of Initiative 872, partisan contests are no longer tied to registered parties, but candidates are allowed to indicate an arbitrary "party preference" to appear next to their name on the primary and general election ballots. An extreme example of this occurred in the 40th District race for state senator, where candidate Timothy Stoddard indicated a preference for the "Salmon Yoga" party.

Republican candidate Dino Rossi listed his party preference as "G.O.P." instead of the traditional party name "Republican". Critics of Rossi contended that the choice of party name was an attempt to distance himself from any negative opinions associated with the Republican Party. Rossi's campaign argued that the difference was insignificant, saying voters are already aware that the terms refer to the same party. However, an Elway Research poll taken in August 2008 found that over 25% of registered voters were not aware that the term "GOP" meant the Republican Party.

On September 23, the Washington State Democrats, alleging that the latter is a misrepresentation of his true party affiliation, filed a lawsuit against the Secretary of State to force the state to list Rossi to on the general election ballot as a Republican instead of with the "GOP Party" label. A King County Superior Court judge dismissed the suit, saying nothing in state law made the choice of party name illegal, but he acknowledged the potential confusion. Had the lawsuit succeeded, many counties would have had to reprint their ballots, and the already-cast absentee votes of military personnel may have become invalid.

Primary results
While the primary was officially held on August 19, 2008, some counties such as King County allow absentee ballots to be postmarked by that date in order to be valid. As a result, the primary vote tally may not be officially certified until as late as September 9, to allow time for mailed-in ballots to arrive and be counted by the counties. As an increasing number of counties allow, encourage, or mandate mail-in ballots for voters within the county, the number of such ballots can be significant.

The vote tally as of October 10 is as follows:

General election 
Christine Gregoire and Dino Rossi were declared the winners of the primary and placed on the ballot for the November 4 election, which coincided with the national election. However, with all Washington counties either exclusively or (in the case of Pierce and King counties) predominantly voting via mail-in ballot, many votes were cast prior to that date. King County, the largest county in the state, and the one which carried Gregoire to victory in 2004, sent out overseas absentee ballots on October 5, and resident mail-in ballots on October 17.

In Washington state, mail-in ballots only need to be postmarked, not received, by November 4, meaning that valid ballots will continue to be received and counted after that date. For the 2008 election, counties had until November 26 to send results to the state, and the Secretary of State had until December 4 to certify all state results.

Predictions

Polling
Aggregate polls

Police Guild press conference incident
At an August 7 press conference held by the Seattle Police Officers Guild to declare its endorsement of Rossi, the Guild forcibly removed Kelly Akers, a Gregoire campaign staffer who was filming the event, from the premises. The Rossi campaign reiterated a standing policy to prevent opposing campaigns from filming Rossi's appearances, to deny them the ability to take "attack footage." Rossi's campaign staff includes a cameraman tasked with filming Gregoire appearances.

Debates
Five debates were held
between Gregoire and Rossi, the candidates in the general election.

*The Spokane debate was taped in the morning to be aired at the indicated time. All other debates were held and aired live.

The Gregoire campaign had sought a sixth debate in Tacoma, sponsored by the Tacoma News-Tribune. The Rossi campaign instead sought a sixth debate in Vancouver, Washington, sponsored by The Columbian. The local Camas-Washougal Rotary Club went so far as to reserve a venue for October 8. The campaigns could not agree on either event.

The Gregoire campaign had set aside August 15 for a pre-primary radio debate with Rossi on Seattle NPR station KUOW-FM. Rossi declined to appear, giving Gregoire solo airtime.

Results
These are the gubernatorial election results as of 11/25/2008 10:45 PM PST.

Early declaration
Gregoire declared victory after late evening returns were posted, with 42% of the statewide vote counted, showing her with a 52% lead over Rossi. By 10:30 PM PST (1:30 AM EST) all five major television networks had called the race for Gregoire. The Rossi campaign called the networks' declarations "premature" and did not concede defeat that evening. Rossi held out hope that late ballots would carry him, as late returns had reversed an early Gregoire lead in 2004. Rossi conceded the next morning.

Concession
Rossi conceded defeat in the gubernatorial election on November 5. In his concession speech, he indicated that he was not planning a return to politics.

Counties that flipped from Democratic to Republican 
Cowlitz (largest city: Longview)

Counties that flipped from Republican to Democratic 
Island (largest city: Oak Harbor)
Kitsap (largest city: Bremerton)
Pierce (largest city: Tacoma)
Skagit (largest city: Mount Vernon)

Notes

References

External links
Elections from the Washington Secretary of State
Washington Governor candidates at Project Vote Smart
Washington Governor race from 2008 Race Tracker
Campaign contributions from Follow the Money
Rossi (R) vs Gregoire (D-i) graph of collected poll results from Pollster.com
Official campaign websites (Archived)
Christine Gregoire, Democratic incumbent candidate
Dino Rossi, Republican candidate

Washington
Gubernatorial
2008